The Portugal National Championship was the national ice hockey championship in Portugal. It was only contested for the 2000-01 season. All games were played at the Palácio do Gelo in Viseu. Ice practices and friendly games have been held since 2010 in Elvas, Portugal.

2000-01 season

Final Table

Schedule

External links
2000-01 season on hockeyarchives.info

Defunct ice hockey leagues in Europe